Josafat Wooding "Joe" Mendes (born 31 December 2002) is a Swedish professional footballer who plays as a defender for Primeira Liga club S.C. Braga.

Early life
Born and raised in Stockholm, Mendes started to play football as a youngster for local club AFC United, before moving to AIK at age 12. In 2020, he appeared in several friendlies for the club's first team, but did not feature in any competitive games.

Club career

Hammarby IF
In 2021, Mendes joined Hammarby Talang FF in Ettan, Sweden's third division. During the first half of the season, he scored once in 12 league appearances, whilst also providing six assists.

On 19 July 2021, Mendes was promoted to their parent club Hammarby IF in Allsvenskan, the domestic first tier, signing a two-year deal. He made his competitive debut only days later, on 22 July, coming on as a substitute in a 3–1 home win against Maribor in the UEFA Europa Conference League.

Return to AIK
On 21 December 2021, it was announced that Mendes returned to his former club AIK, in an undisclosed deal between the two rival clubs. He signed a four year-contract with the Allsvenskan club, effective in January 2022.

S.C. Braga
On 28 January 2023, Portuguese side Braga announced the signing of Mendes on a five-and-a-half year long contract.

International career
In 2018, Mendes won two caps for the Swedish U17 national team, playing in two friendlies against Belgium and Czech Republic. He made his full international debut for Sweden on 12 January 2023 in a friendly 2–1 win against Iceland.

Personal life
Born in Sweden, Mendes is of DR Congolese and Angolan descent. He is the cousin of the Swedish footballer Jardell Kanga.

Career statistics

Club

International

References

External links

2002 births
Living people
Footballers from Stockholm
Swedish footballers
Sweden under-21 international footballers
Sweden youth international footballers
Swedish people of Democratic Republic of the Congo descent
Association football defenders
Hammarby Talang FF players
Hammarby Fotboll players
AIK Fotboll players
Ettan Fotboll players
S.C. Braga players
Primeira Liga players